Illia Volodymyrovych Kyva (born 2 June 1977) is a Ukrainian politician. He worked as an official and policeman before entering politics, heading the Poltava chapter of the Right Sector party before taking the Socialist Party of Ukraine under his control in 2017 and serving as its leader from 2017 to 2019.

In 2019, he was an unsuccessful presidential candidate, and he proceeded to be elected as a member of the Opposition Platform — For Life party in the Verkhovna Rada, Ukraine's national parliament, between 2019 and the 15 March 2022, when the Verkhovna Rada deprived him of his mandate, following comments in support of Russia during the 2022 Russian invasion of Ukraine.  During Russia's ongoing war in Ukraine, he effectively defected to Russia by asking Russian president Vladimir Putin for a Russian passport (Russian citizenship) and political asylum.

Biography 
Until 2003, Kyva studied at the Oil and Gas Geological and Mechanical-Technical School in his native Poltava, specializing in maintenance. He also took courses to become a "pedagogue-psychologist".

In 2005, he was hired to become the chief accountant of an industrial company.

In 2009, he graduated with a degree in Law from the Yaroslav Mudryi National Law University.

In 2010, he worked in the department of roadworks.

In 2011, he became the head of Poltava's consumer rights department, for a short spell of two months. He was charged for corruption by a district tribunal of the Poltava region, sentenced Kyva to ₴10,000, and barred him from public office for one year.

Politics

2013–2017 
Kvya's political career began in 2013, when he unsuccessfully stood for the Verkhovna Rada.

In 2014, Kyva became a police major (майор міліції) and was appointed commander of his native town's battalion, "Poltavshchyna". He became the leader of Right Sector's Eastern division stretching from Poltava to Donetsk, and was the representative of Dmytro Yarosh's 2014 presidential election campaign.

He was then appointed deputy chief of the Ministry of Internal Affairs' regional department for Donetsk.

At this time he also befriended Dmytro Korchynsky, founder of the St Mary's battalion which fought in the War in Donbass.

In 2016, he attracted controversy for endorsing extrajudicial methods of combating drug crime while at the helm of the ministry's anti-drug crime division.

From 2016 to 2017, he was an advisor to Minister of Internal Affairs Arsen Avakov.

2019–2022 
Kyva was an unsuccessful candidate in the 2019 Ukrainian presidential election, receiving a few thousand votes under the banner of the Socialist Party of Ukraine. However, he would later make a political u-turn and get elected as a member of the pro-Russian Opposition Platform — For Life list in the 2019 Ukrainian parliamentary election. Kyva went on to host his own show on the ZIK TV channel, said to be controlled by oligarch and leader of co-chairman of the Opposition Platform Viktor Medvedchuk.

On 24 February 2022 Russia launched a full scale invasion of Ukraine. On the same day Kyva expressed support for the invasion, claiming "the Ukrainian people need liberation" and that "Ukrainians, Belarusians, Russians are one people." Furthermore he stated that Ukraine was "enslaved and brought to its knees by the West, imbued with Nazism, and has no future." He blamed the war on Ukrainian President Volodymyr Zelenskyy and urged him to resign.

Prior to the invasion, Kyva had left for Spain. On 3 March 2022, Kyva was expelled from the party and faction of Opposition Platform — For Life. On 6 March 2022, Prosecutor General Iryna Venediktova announced that Kiva was being charged with high treason, as well as infringing on Ukraine's territorial integrity, taking part in Russian war propaganda, and illegal weapons possession.

On 15 March 2022, the Verkhovna Rada deprived Kyva of his mandate as a People's Deputy.

On 17 April 2022, he called on the Kremlin to launch a nuclear strike on Ukraine from his Telegram account, stating “Zelensky, his entourage and Western curators, are most afraid of a Russian preemptive strike, weapons of mass destruction. This is what can put an end to today's confrontation, not only with the Ukrainian authorities, but with the entire West.”

On 18 April 2022, it was reported that Ukraine's State Bureau of Investigations had opened a case of treason against Kyva for involvement in an illegal arrangement with a general of the Russian Armed Forces.

On 21 April 2022, in an open letter to Russian president Vladimir Putin, Kyva applied for Russian citizenship and political asylum.

Based on the analysis of videos published on his Telegram account, Ukrainian investigation platform  concluded (on 20 June 2022) that Kyva had settled in the cottage town of Agalarov Estate, near the village Pokrovskoye in Moscow Oblast.

See also 

 List of members of the parliament of Ukraine, 2019–23

Notes

References 

1977 births
Living people
Politicians from Poltava
Socialist Party of Ukraine politicians
Ninth convocation members of the Verkhovna Rada
Expelled members of the Verkhovna Rada
Recipients of the Order of Danylo Halytsky
Treason in Ukraine
Ukrainian collaborators with Russia during the 2022 Russian invasion of Ukraine
Fugitives wanted by Ukraine